Walter E. Erkes (March 25, 1884 - June 23, 1961) was an American architect. He became an architect in California, where he designed buildings in Oxnard, Alhambra, and Los Angeles, some of which he designed buildings with architect John Paul Krempel, like the German Hospital in Boyle Heights. Erkes also designed the Inglewood Mausoleum in Inglewood.

References

1884 births
1961 deaths
Architects from California
20th-century American architects